The 2018–19 Taça de Portugal (also known as Taça de Portugal Placard for sponsorship reasons) was the 79th edition of the Taça de Portugal, the premier knockout competition in Portuguese football. The competition began with first-round matches on 8 September 2018 and concluded with the final on 25 May 2019.

This edition was contested by 144 clubs, including teams from the top three tiers of the Portuguese football league system and representatives of the fourth-tier District leagues and cups. This was the first season to allow a fourth substitution during extra time.

Primeira Liga side Desportivo das Aves were the defending champions, but they were eliminated by Braga in the quarter-finals.

Format

Teams
A total of 144 teams will compete in the 2018–19 Taça de Portugal: 18 teams from Primeira Liga, 14 teams from the LigaPro, 71 teams from the Campeonato de Portugal and 41 teams from the district championships.

Primeira Liga

 Belenenses SAD
 Benfica
 Boavista
 Braga
 Chaves
 Desportivo das Aves
 Feirense
 Marítimo
 Moreirense

 Nacional
 Portimonense
 Porto
 Rio Ave
 Santa Clara
 Sporting CP
 Tondela
 Vitória de Guimarães
 Vitória de Setúbal

LigaPro

 Académica
 Académico de Viseu
 Arouca
 Cova da Piedade
 Estoril
 Famalicão
 Farense

 Leixões
 Mafra
 Oliveirense
 Paços de Ferreira
 Penafiel
 Sp. Covilhã
 Varzim

Campeonato de Portugal

Series A
 AD Oliveirense
 Caçadores das Taipas
 Chaves Satélite
 Fafe
 Felgueiras 1932
 Gil Vicente
 Limianos
 Maria da Fonte
 Merelinense
 Mirandela
 Mirandês
 Montalegre
 Pedras Salgadas
 São Martinho
 Torcatense
 Trofense
 Vilaverdense
 Vizela

Series B
 Amarante
 Cesarense
 Cinfães
 Coimbrões
 Gafanha
 Gondomar
 Leça
 Lusitânia Lourosa
 Lusitano Vildemoinhos
 Paredes
 Pedras Rubras
 Penalva do Castelo
 Águeda
 Sanjoanense
 Sp. Espinho
 Sp. Mêda
 União da Madeira

Series C
 AD Nogueirense
 Alcains
 Alverca
 Anadia
 Benfica Castelo Branco
 Caldas
 Fátima
 Loures
 Mação
 Oleiros
 Oliveira do Hospital
 Peniche
 Santa Iria
 Sertanense
 Sintrense
 Torreense
 União de Leiria
 Vilafranquense

Series D
 1.º Dezembro
 Amora
 Angrense
 Armacenenses
 Casa Pia
 Ferreiras
 Louletano
 Moura
 Olhanense
 Olímpico Montijo
 Oriental
 Pinhalnovense
 Praiense
 Real
 Redondense
 Sacavenense
 Sp. Ideal
 Vasco da Gama Vidigueira

District Championships

Algarve FA
 Silves (2nd)
 Almancilense (CW)
Angra do Heroísmo FA
 Graciosa
 Marítimo Graciosa
Aveiro FA
 Beira Mar (2nd)
 Pampilhosa (CR)
Beja FA
 Praia Milfontes (2nd)
 Mineiro Aljustrelense (CW)
Braga FA
 Vieira (3rd)
 Joane (CW)
Bragança FA
 Vila Flor (2nd)
 Vinhais (CW)

Castelo Branco FA
 Sernache (2nd)
 Idanhense (3rd)
Coimbra FA
 Clube Condeixa (2nd)
 Eirense (CR)
Évora FA
 Juventude Évora (2nd)
 Lusitano Évora (CW)
Guarda FA
 Trancoso (2nd)
 Gouveia (CW)
Horta FA
None
Leiria FA
 Amigos da Paz (2nd)
 Beneditense (CW)

Lisbon FA
 Lourinhanense (3rd)
 Coutada (CW)
Madeira FA
 Machico (2nd)
Ponta Delgada FA
 Rabo de Peixe
 Vale Formoso
Portalegre FA
 Gafetense (2nd)
 Portalegrense (CW)
Porto FA
 Valadares Gaia (3rd)
 Rio Tinto (CW)

Santarém FA
 União de Tomar (2nd)
 Torres Novas (3rd)
Setúbal FA
 Barreirense (2nd)
 União Santiago (CR)
Viana do Castelo FA
 Vianense (2nd)
 Valenciano (CW)
Vila Real FA
 Régua (2nd)
 Vila Real (CW)
Viseu FA
 Sp. Lamego (1st)
 Vila de Silgueiros (CW)

Schedule 
All draws are held at the FPF headquarters at Cidade do Futebol, in Oeiras. Match kick-off times are in WET (UTC±0) from the fourth round to the semi-finals, and in WEST (UTC+1) during the rest of the competition.

First round
Times are WEST (UTC+1) (local times, if different, are in parentheses).

Second round 

Repechage
The following 22 first-round losing teams were selected to compete in the second round:

 Alverca (CP)
 Beneditense (D)
 Coimbrões (CP)
 Fátima (CP)
 Joane (D)
 Leça (CP)
 Louletano (CP)
 Lourinhanense (D)
 Lusitano Vildemoinhos (CP)
 Mirandês (CP)
 Montalegre (CP)
 Paredes (CP)
 Praia Milfontes (D)
 Portalegrense (D)
 Sp. Ideal (CP)
 Torres Novas (D)
 União Santiago (D)
 Vale Formoso (D)
 Valenciano (CP)
 Vila de Silgueiros (D)
 Vila Flor (D)
 Vilafranquense (CP)

Fixtures
Times are WEST (UTC+1) (local times, if different, are in parentheses).

Third round 

Times are WEST (UTC+1) (local times, if different, are in parentheses).

Fourth round 

Times are WET (UTC±0) (local times, if different, are in parentheses).

Fifth round 

Times are WET (UTC±0).

Quarter-finals 

Times are WET (UTC±0).

Semi-finals

Times are WET (UTC±0).

Porto won 4–1 on aggregate.

2–2 on aggregate. Sporting CP won on away goals.

Final

Bracket

Television rights
The following matches were or broadcast live on Portuguese television:

Notes

References

External links

Taça de Portugal seasons
Portugal